All hat and no cattle is an idiom meaning "all talk, no action".

All hat and no cattle can also refer to:
All Hat and No Cattle, a 2013 album by Chris Shiflett & the Dead Peasants
"All Hat, No Cattle", a song by artist Trace Adkins in his album More...